Kapitan Sowa na tropie is a Polish series from 1965 directed by Stanisław Bareja. It was the first Polish criminal series made after World War II.

1965 films
Polish crime films
1960s Polish-language films
Films directed by Stanisław Bareja